Fate's Funny Frolic is a 1911 silent short comedy romance film directed by R.E. Baker and starring Francis X. Bushman. It was produced by the Essanay Studios, Chicago and distributed by the General Film Company.

Cast
Francis X. Bushman - Richard Malcolm
Dorothy Phillips - Alice Trevor
Frank Dayton -

See also
Francis X. Bushman filmography

References

External links
 Fate's Funny Frolic at IMDb.com

1911 films
Essanay Studios films
1911 short films
American silent short films
American romantic comedy films
1910s romantic comedy films
American black-and-white films
1911 comedy films
1910s American films
Silent romantic comedy films
Silent American comedy films